Exiles and New Exiles were comic book series which featured an ensemble cast of Marvel Comics characters. Exiles vol. 1 featured the fictional teams of the eponymous Exiles and rival Weapon X, both of which had a revolving cast, most often rotating under the plot device of character death. The characters were either previous established or new re-imagings of established characters.

Founding members

Replacements

Weapon X, Wolverines, Quentin Quire, and other teams
Weapon X was an alternate, more violent team recruited by the Timebroker to deal with more gruesome missions. After the Timebreakers fired the original Exiles Team, they gathered multiple squads consisting solely of alternate versions of Wolverine. The last Wolverine squad was formed in Exiles #85 and consisted the members listed below. Another team led by Quentin Quire was created by Blink to fix a world where heroes had died but this time was left in one dimension and was never meant to travel through other. Finally, several teams were shown in Exiles (vol 3) #6 but responded to other Timebrokers.

Weapon X

Wolverine squads

The mission of these Wolverine Teams was to eliminate the Brother Mutant, but Brother Mutant captured and hypnotized them. Finally, the last Wolverine team manages to kill the Brother Mutant, with the help of the first Exiles team. In the end, seventeen Wolverines perished during the fight. James Howlett was the only member sent home.

Quentin Quire's Exiles

Their mission was to save Quentin's world by replacing heroes who had died.

Other teams (Exiles #6)
Very First team: Kang the Conqueror, Silver Surfer, Iron Man, Daredevil, Spider-Man, The Thing, later on an overweight Colossus, a male and female Sentry, a male and female Quentin Quire, Archangel and Prodigy.
Captain America, Wolverine, Spider-Man, The Hulk, two unknown members. Timebroker: Impossible Man
MODOK, The Lizard, Deadpool, Venom, Selene, one unknown member. Timebroker: Mojo
The Thing, Namor, four unknown members. Timebroker: Howard the Duck
Match, Icarus, two unidentified members, two unknown members. Timebroker: Silver Surfer

Exiles vol. 2 recruits

Exiles vol. 3 recruits

Other characters
In Exiles there has been a number of other characters including special heroes and villains; some of them are even significant in more than one reality and/or story.

Line-ups
The Exiles' line-up is known to change quite often, here is a list of its various compositions:
By issue number

See also
Exiles

References

Exile